The Egyptian Air Defenses Academy (Arabic: كلية الدفاع الجوى), is the country's scientific military college aimed to supply the Egyptian Armed Forces with its need of the professional engineers. It was established in 1974. Graduates of the Air Defenses Academy get commissioned as officers in the Egyptian Air Defense Command.

Its director is Maj. Gen. Yehia Abd-elgawwad Alshazely.

Academic Objectives
Preparing a qualified scientifically militant officer, capable of commanding a sub unit effectively with high physical fitness as well as his capability of dealing with the high technology Air Defence weapons to keep up with the modern airwar methods. 

Upon Graduation;
 Bachelor's degree of Air Defense sciences after the completion of the fourth educational year.
 Bachelor's degree of Engineering in communications and Electronics section after the completion of the fifth educational year.

Organization

The college is divided into four main sections:
 The first section
The college administration which is responsible for training, planning and following up under the supervision of the college commandant.

The Second Section
It includes the following educational branches

 Engineering Science branch
Is equipped with modern laboratories that serve the Engineering study and allow the cadets to do the engineering experiments with the rate of 4 cadets for each experiment.
 Air Defence specialize branches
Cadets receive an academic and practical training on the Air Defence Equipment in these branches.
 General Training branch
It is responsible for adapting cadets to military life and teaching them military sciences.

 The third section
It is responsible for the college logistics and providing it with its administrative needs.

The fourth section
It contains the cadet brigade formation that is responsible for cadets discipline and providing their needs.

References
http://www.mmc.gov.eg/Academies/airdef%20academy/director.asp
https://web.archive.org/web/20120206004526/http://www.mmc.gov.eg/Academies/academie.htm

Military academies of Egypt
Military units and formations established in 1974